As a nickname, Basher or the Basher may refer to:

As "Basher" 

 Robert Bates (loyalist) (1948–1997), a member of the loyalist Shankill Butchers gang from Belfast, Northern Ireland
 Basher Hassan (born 1944), Kenyan retired cricketer Sheikh Basharat Hassan
 Nick Lowe (born 1949), English singer-songwriter, musician and producer
 Jack "Basher" Williams (1917–2000), Australian rules footballer

As "the Basher" 

 Subhas Anandan (1947–2015), a prominent criminal lawyer in Singapore with numerous high-profile cases, including a 2010 case involving actress Quan Yi Fong

See also 

 
 
 Basher (disambiguation)

Lists of people by nickname